Wankarani (Aymara wankara a kind of drum, -ni a suffix to indicate ownership, "the one with a wankara", Hispanicized spelling Huancarane) is a  mountain in the Andes of Peru, about  high. It is located in the Puno Region, Lampa Province, Palca District.

See also 
 Yanawara

References

Mountains of Puno Region
Mountains of Peru